Cochwillan is a medieval hall house situated in the lower Ogwen Valley, south of the village of Talybont in the parish of Llanllechid, between Bethesda and Llandygai. It is designated by Cadw as a Grade I listed building.

History 
Cochwillan was built around 1465 by William ap Gruffudd who for supporting Henry Tudor at the Battle of Bosworth was rewarded by being named Sheriff of Caernarvonshire. In the 17th century John Williams, Archbishop of York combined the hall with the Penrhyn estate. By 1969 it was in use as a barn when it was restored by Cadw and the Penhryn estate.

Features 
Many of its original architectural elements are still intact, including the hammerbeam roof of three bays, and unusual for the time, a lateral fireplace.

In poetry 
The owners of the hall gave patronage for some of the most prominent poets of the period such as Lewys Daron, Lewys Môn and Guto'r Glyn.

References

Further reading 
 Darganfod Tai Hanesyddol Eryri: Discovering the Historic Houses of Snowdonia by Richard Suggett and Margaret Dunn, Royal Commission on the Ancient & Historical Monuments of Wales, 2014, 
 A Gwynedd (Guide to Ancient & Historic Wales) by Welsh Historic Monuments, Stationery Office Books, 1995,

External links 
 Cochwillan, Coflein
 A Genealogical Account of the Families of Penrhyn and Cochwillan by William Williams, 1802

Bethesda, Gwynedd
Grade I listed buildings in Gwynedd
Houses in Gwynedd
Grade I listed houses
Hall houses